Emerson Charles Itschner (July 1, 1903 – March 15, 1995) was an American military engineer.

Biography

Emerson C. Itschner was born in Chicago on July 1, 1903. He graduated from the United States Military Academy in 1924 and was commissioned in the Corps of Engineers. He obtained a degree in civil engineering from Cornell University in 1926.

Itschner served with the Alaska Road Commission in 1927–1929. He taught at the Missouri School of Mines and served as assistant to the Upper Mississippi Valley Division Engineer and the St. Louis District Engineer. He commanded a topographic survey company in 1940–1941. In 1942–1943 Itschner headed the office in Corps headquarters that supervised Army airfield construction in the 48 states. In 1944–1945 he oversaw the reconstruction of ports and the development of supply routes to U.S. forces in Europe as Engineer, ADSEC (Advance Section, Communications Zone). Itschner headed the division in Corps headquarters responsible for military construction operations from 1946 to 1949. After a year as Seattle District Engineer, he went to Korea as Engineer of I Corps and oversaw engineer troop operations in western Korea. He was North Pacific Division Engineer in 1952–1953. From 1953 until being appointed Chief of Engineers, he served as Assistant Chief of Engineers for Civil Works. General Itschner retired in 1961.

He died in Portland, Oregon on March 15, 1995.

The Itschner Award is given each year by the Society of American Military Engineers in his honor.

Decorations
He was awarded the Distinguished Service Medal, Legion of Merit with two Oak Leaf Clusters, Bronze Star, and the Purple Heart.
  Army Distinguished Service Medal
  Legion of Merit
  Bronze Star
  Purple Heart

See also

References

This article contains public domain text from

External links
 Itschner Award at the Society of American Military Engineers

1903 births
1995 deaths
Military personnel from Chicago
United States Army personnel of World War II
United States Army Corps of Engineers personnel
United States Army generals
Cornell University College of Engineering alumni
Missouri University of Science and Technology faculty
Missouri University of Science and Technology alumni
Recipients of the Legion of Merit
Recipients of the Distinguished Service Medal (US Army)
United States Military Academy alumni
United States Army Corps of Engineers Chiefs of Engineers